Dichomeris acuminata, the alfalfa leaf tier, is a moth of the family Gelechiidae. It was first described by Otto Staudinger in 1876. It is a widely distributed species, being known from India, Myanmar, and Sri Lanka southwest to the Seychelles, Mauritius and Réunion and on to Egypt, east and South Africa and southern Europe. Eastward from India it extends through Indonesia and Malaysia to Taiwan and Australia. It is also found in Japan, the West Indies, North America and Hawaii.

The wingspan is about 10 mm. The forewings are yellow with fuscous. The male has a remarkable, expandable, fanlike hair tuft on the mesopleura at the base of each forewing.

Larvae have been recorded on Medicago sativa, Cyamopsis, Desmodium gyroides, Java indigo, Medicago species, Cajanus cajan, Sesbania sericea and Tephrosia species. They are leaf-rollers. Full-grown larvae are about 7 mm long and green with shiny black head.

Pupation takes place either between two leaves fastened together or in a rolled leaf or in a larval shelter of top-leaves bound together, the interior of the shelter being lined with a thin layer of silken fibre. The pupa is about 5 mm long. The pupal period is about six days.

References

External links

Japanese Moths

Moths described in 1876
acuminata
Moths of Asia
Moths of Japan
Moths of Europe
Moths of Mauritius
Moths of Seychelles
Moths of Réunion
Moths of Africa